Mahaplaban Padak 1996 (Bengali: মহাপ্লাবন পদক ১৯৯৬), is a military medal of Bangladesh. The medal was established in 1996. The medal is intended for awarding servicemen who took part in the liquidation of the consequences of the flood of 1996.

References 

Military awards and decorations of Bangladesh